Karma is the fifth full-length album by power metal band Kamelot. It was released on July 9, 2001 through Noise Records which is a part of Sanctuary Records.

Track listing

Personnel
All information from the album booklet.

Kamelot
 Roy Khan – vocals
 Thomas Youngblood – guitars
 Glenn Barry – bass
 Casey Grillo – drums, percussion

Additional musicians
 Miro – keyboards, orchestrations, backing vocals, producer, mixing, mastering, engineering
 Sascha Paeth – additional guitars, producer, mixing, mastering, engineering
 Farouk Asjadi – Shakuhachi
 Liv Nina Mosven – vocals on "Requiem for the Innocent" and "Fall from Grace"
 Olaf Hayer – choir vocals
 Cinzia Rizzo – choir vocals, backing vocals on "Karma"
 Robert Hunecke-Rizzo – choir vocals

Strings quartet
 Tobias Rempe – violin
 Corinna Guthmann – violin
 Marie-Theres Stumpf – viola
 Patrick Sepec – cello

Production
 Kim Grillo – photography
 Derek Gores – artwork

Charts

Notes

 "Forever" is based on "Solveig's Song", written by Edvard Grieg for his Peer Gynt Suites.
 "Don't You Cry" is dedicated to Thomas Youngblood Sr., who died when his son was very young.
 "Ne Pleure Pas" is essentially the same song as "Don't You Cry", only sung in French.
 The trilogy of songs that close the album on the normal edition, "Elizabeth" I, II & III, are based on the story of Elizabeth Bathory.
 There is silence from the end of "Fall From Grace" to 11:00. This is because Karma was Kamelot's fifth studio album and they wanted its duration to be 55:55. The silence is kept intact even in versions of the album with bonus tracks.

References

External links
 

2001 albums
Kamelot albums
Sanctuary Records albums